Ascoli may refer to:

Places in Italy
Ascoli Satriano, a town and comune in the province of Foggia in the Apulia region
Province of Ascoli Piceno, a province of the Marche region
Ascoli Piceno, a city which is the seat of the province above
Porto d'Ascoli, a civil parish in the province above
Roman Catholic Diocese of Ascoli Piceno,

People
Alberto Ascoli (1877–1957), Italian medical researcher
Conrad of Ascoli (1234–1289), Italian Friar Minor and missionary
Enoch of Ascoli (c. 1400–c. 1457), Italian manuscript collector
Giulio Ascoli (1843–1896), Italian mathematician
Graziadio Isaia Ascoli (1829–1907), Italian linguist
Guido Ascoli (1887–1957), Italian mathematician
Max Ascoli (1898–1978), Italian-American professor of political philosophy and law
Nicola Ascoli (born 1979), Italian football player

Other uses
Ascoli Calcio 1898, a football club based in Ascoli Piceno
Ascoli Piceno railway station